The members of the eleventh National Assembly of South Korea were elected on 25 March 1981. The Assembly sat from 11 April 1981 until 10 April 1985.

Members

Seoul

Busan

Gyeonggi

Gangwon

North Chungcheong

South Chungcheong

North Jeolla

South Jeolla

North Gyeongsang

South Gyeongsang

Jeju

Proportional representation

Notes

References

011
National Assembly members 011